Toyota Industries Shuttles Aichi (also called Toyota Jido Shokki as distinct from Toyota, which was renamed Toyota Verblitz) is a Japanese rugby team owned by Toyota Industries. They were promoted to Japan's top-flight league Top League for the first time in the 2010-11 season. Its home base is Kariya City. The team rebranded as Toyota Industries Shuttles Aichi ahead of the rebranding of the Top League to the Japan Rugby League One in 2022.

Name and colours

The team name "Shuttles" derives from a part used in the Non-Stop Shuttle Change Toyoda Automatic Loom (for weaving fabrics), invented by Sakichi Toyoda, the founder of Toyota Industries.

The team and plays in a sky blue jersey with white shorts and sky blue socks.

History
The Toyota Industries rugby team was founded in 1984. In the late 1990s, the team played in the Kansai League and competed in the Companies National Tournament. From 2003–04, Toyota Industries competed in the West Regional League.

Toyota Industries gained promotion to the Top League for the first time in 2010-11, but only stayed up for one season.

Under Australian coach Tai McIsaac, Toyota Shokki defeated Fukuoka Sanix Blues in a promotion-relegation match in 2013 to gain entry to the 2013–14 Top League.

Stadium

Toyota Shokki play their Top League home games at Mizuho Rugby Stadium in Nagoya. The stadium holds 15,000 people and was originally built in 1941. It has also been used to host international rugby matches, including for the 2014 Asian Five Nations.

The team trains at the Toyota Industries ground in Kariya.

Current squad

The Toyota Industries Shuttles Aichi squad for the 2023 season is:

Former players 

Tusi Pisi 
Freddie Burns
Anthony Monahan
Dion Waller
Ben Gollings
Ellis Young
Daniel Turner
Rowan Varty
Ifereimi Rawaqa
Tyson Wulf

See also
Top League Challenge Series
Toyota Industries S.C.

References

External links
  (Japanese)

Japan Rugby League One teams
Sports teams in Aichi Prefecture
Toyota
1984 establishments in Japan
Rugby clubs established in 1984